Mehdi Torkaman (born March 8, 1989) is an Iranian footballer who plays as a left back for Mes Rafsanjan in the Persian Gulf Pro League.

Club career

Saipa
He made his debut for Saipa in last fixtures of 2011–12 Iran Pro League against Naft Abadan while he substituted in for Roozbeh Shahalidoost.

Pars Jam 
Torkaman signed a two-year deal with Pars Jam on 16 June 2019 and returned to first tier of Iran football.

Sepahan

References

External links
 
  

1989 births
Living people
Iranian footballers
Association football defenders
Saipa F.C. players
Pars Jonoubi Jam players
People from Karaj
21st-century Iranian people